Tunku Laksamana Nasir Alam ibni Tuanku Muhammad Shah died in Seri Menanti, Negeri Sembilan, Malaysia in 1976. He is one of the sons of Tuanku Muhammad Shah. He was a member of the Negeri Sembilan royal family and is interred in Seri Menanti Royal Mausoleum. He served as Regent of Negeri Sembilan from 2 September 1957 to 1 April 1960, whilst his brother (Tuanku Abdul Rahman) served his term as Yang di-Pertuan Agong of Malaya.

He had issue: seven sons and three daughters.

There are primary and secondary school in Kuala Pilah that is named after him.

References

People from Negeri Sembilan
1976 deaths
Year of birth missing
Royal House of Negeri Sembilan
Sons of monarchs